Edward Elgar's Symphony No 2 was first recorded complete in 1927 by His Master's Voice (later part of the EMI group) conducted by the composer. (Elgar had conducted a truncated version by the old acoustic process in 1924.) This recording was reissued on LP record and later on compact disc. There was no further recording for seventeen years, until Sir Adrian Boult made the first of his five recordings of the symphony in 1944. Since then there have been many more new recordings, the majority played by British orchestras with seven of them recorded by the London Philharmonic.

Recordings by date

Critical opinion
BBC Radio 3's "Building a Library" feature has broadcast comparative reviews of all available recordings of the symphony on three occasions since the 1980s. The recommendations were as follows:

18 May 1985, reviewer, Robert Philip:
BBC Symphony Orchestra, Sir Adrian Boult 
London Philharmonic Orchestra, Vernon Handley
8 April 1995, reviewer, Jerrold Northrop Moore:
London Symphony Orchestra, Sir Edward Elgar 
London Philharmonic Orchestra, Sir Georg Solti
15 October 2005, reviewer, David Nice:
BBC Symphony Orchestra, Sir Adrian Boult 
London Symphony Orchestra, Sir Colin Davis

The Penguin Guide to Recorded Classical Music, 2008, gave its maximum four star rating to the Decca recording by Solti and the London Philharmonic, coupled with the First Symphony, and the EMI recording by Handley with the same orchestra.

In September 2011, Gramophone in a comparative review of all recordings of the work recommended those by the composer, Thomson, Elder, and, as first choice, Boult (1968).

Notes

References
March, Ivan (ed). The Penguin Guide to Recorded Classical Music, Penguin Books, London, 2007. 

Symphony discographies
Symphony No. 2 discography